Tupi टुपि is a bundle of hair usually kept by the Hindu people. The history and obligations of Tupi are exactly the same way where the Hindu people keep it for their cultural introductions.

History 
pending

See also 
 Hinduism

References 

Hindu culture
Human hair